Klaus Hofmann (born 20 March 1939) is a German musicologist who is an expert on the music of Johann Sebastian Bach.

Born in Würzburg, Hofmann studied after graduation (1958) from 1958 to 1959 at the University of Erlangen. He then continued his studies at the Albert-Ludwigs-University Freiburg. In 1968 he received his doctorate with a dissertation " " (Studies on the composition technique of the motet in the 13th century, performed on the motets with tenor ). From 1968 to 1978 he worked as an employee of the Hänssler Verlag. From 1978 he was a research assistant of the Johann Sebastian Bach Institute in Göttingen, one of the two institutions which prepared the Neue Bach-Ausgabe, the second complete edition of Bach's work. In 2004 he was appointed to the position of Executive Director, a position which he held until the Institute closed in 2006.

He is a board member of the copyright collective . In 1994 he was appointed honorary professor at the Georg-August-Universität Göttingen.

Selected publications 

In 2003, he wrote a book on the motets by Bach, Johann Sebastian Bach. ., published by Bärenreiter. He divided his book in two parts, one dedicated to the facts and history of the works, the other to musical analysis.

For the music publisher Carus-Verlag, he edited Bach's Christmas Oratorio, supplying a foreword in three languages and a critical report of historical and musicological information. For Breitkopf & Härtel, he reconstructed a trio sonata for violin, viola and basso continuo, based on BWV 1038, and attributed it to both Johann Sebastian Bach and Carl Philipp Emanuel Bach.

References 

German musicologists
1939 births
Living people
Writers from Würzburg
University of Erlangen-Nuremberg alumni
University of Freiburg alumni
Academic staff of the University of Göttingen